Zalina Marghieva (born 5 February 1988) is a female hammer thrower who competes for Moldova. Born in Russia, she is the sister of Marina Marghiev and Serghei Marghiev, and is coached by her father Soslan.

As a junior, she finished fifth at the 2005 World Youth Championships, fourth at the 2006 World Junior Championships and fifth at the 2007 European Junior Championships. She then competed at the 2008 Olympic Games without reaching the final. At the 2009 European U23 Championships she won the gold medal.

She threw a personal best of 71.56 metres in January 2009 in Chişinău to break the national record. She improved this further at the 2011 national winter throws meeting in Chişinău, winning the event with a mark of 72.74 m.

Doping
Similarly to her sister, Marina, she served a two-year ban from athletics after testing positive for prohibited substances dehydrochloromethyltestosterone and stanozolol back in 2009. She resumed competition when her ineligibility ended on 23 July 2015.

Achievements

References

External links
 

1988 births
Living people
Athletes (track and field) at the 2008 Summer Olympics
Athletes (track and field) at the 2012 Summer Olympics
Athletes (track and field) at the 2016 Summer Olympics
Moldovan female hammer throwers
Olympic athletes of Moldova
World Athletics Championships athletes for Moldova
People from Vladikavkaz
Russian emigrants to Moldova
Moldovan sportspeople in doping cases
Doping cases in athletics
Universiade medalists in athletics (track and field)
Universiade gold medalists for Moldova
Universiade bronze medalists for Moldova
Competitors at the 2009 Summer Universiade
Athletes (track and field) at the 2020 Summer Olympics